The Poll Riders Win Again!!! is the second cassette demo tape by the American alternative rock band Walt Mink, released in 1991. As with their first demo tape, many of these songs would be re-recorded over the course of the band's career.

Track listing
All tracks by John Kimbrough except where noted.

Side 1
 "Everything Worthwhile"
 "Miss Happiness"
 "New Life"
 "Pink Moon" (Nick Drake)
 "Disappear"
 "Pop Song"

Side 2
 "Quiet Time"
 "Smoothing The Ride"
 "Twinkle & Shine"
 "Erasable You"
 "9 O'Clock World"
 "Turn of the Religious"
 "Sugartop"

Personnel 
John Kimbrough – guitar, vocals
Candice Belanoff – bass guitar, backing vocals
Joey Waronker – drums, percussion, backing vocals

References

External links
 "Demos" page on Walt Mink's official site @ The Internet Archive

1991 albums
Walt Mink albums